Massachusetts House of Representatives' 24th Middlesex district in the United States is one of 160 legislative districts included in the lower house of the Massachusetts General Court. It covers part of Middlesex County. Democrat Dave Rogers of Cambridge has represented the district since 2013. Candidates for this district seat in the 2020 Massachusetts general election include Jennifer Fries.

Locales represented
The district includes the following localities:
 part of Arlington
 Belmont
 part of Cambridge

The current district geographic boundary overlaps with those of the Massachusetts Senate's 2nd Middlesex district, 4th Middlesex district, and 2nd Suffolk and Middlesex district.

Former locales
The district previously covered:
 North Reading, circa 1872 
 Reading, circa 1872 
 Wilmington, circa 1872

Representatives
 Stephen K. Fielding, circa 1858 
 John C. Jepson, circa 1858 
 Geo. Stevens, circa 1858 
 Walter Burnham, circa 1859 
 John A. Goodwin, circa 1859 
 Tappan Wentworth, circa 1859 
 Solomon K. Dexter, circa 1888 
 George Francis Morey, circa 1888 
 Warren Chapman Daggett, circa 1920 
 Wilbur F. Lewis, circa 1920 
Catherine E. Falvey, 1941-1944
 Joseph F. Leahy, circa 1951 
 Paul A. McCarthy, circa 1951 
 Harold A. Palmer, circa 1951 
 William Francis Hogan, circa 1975 
 Anne M. Paulsen circa 2003–2007 
 William N. Brownsberger 2007–2021
 David M. Rogers, 2013–current

See also
 List of Massachusetts House of Representatives elections
 List of Massachusetts General Courts
 List of former districts of the Massachusetts House of Representatives
 Other Middlesex County districts of the Massachusetts House of Representatives: 1st, 2nd, 3rd, 4th, 5th, 6th, 7th, 8th, 9th, 10th, 11th, 12th, 13th, 14th, 15th, 16th, 17th, 18th, 19th, 20th, 21st, 22nd, 23rd, 25th, 26th, 27th, 28th, 29th, 30th, 31st, 32nd, 33rd, 34th, 35th, 36th, 37th

Legislator portraits

References

External links
 Ballotpedia
  (State House district information based on U.S. Census Bureau's American Community Survey).
 Belmont League of Women Voters
 League of Women Voters of Arlington, Massachusetts

House
Government of Middlesex County, Massachusetts